Lucien Vita is a Republican former member of the New Hampshire House of Representatives from the Strafford 3rd District. In 2011 he endorsed Republican presidential candidate Ron Paul.

Vita was a sponsor for a lawsuit to have Barack Obama dropped from the New Hampshire Presidential race in 2012, claiming that Obama was not born in the United States. Additionally, he co-sponsored a bill requiring all laws in his state to cite the Magna Carta as their basis.

References

External links
Lucien Vita at New Hampshire House of Representatives website

Members of the New Hampshire House of Representatives
Living people
Year of birth missing (living people)
Place of birth missing (living people)